Lucena is a surname of Spanish origin. Notable people with the surname include:

César Lucena (born 1980), retired Brazilian footballer
Elena Lucena (1914–2015), Argentine film actress
Francisco de Lucena (c. 1578–1643), Portuguese nobleman
Franklin Lucena (born 1981), Venezuelan footballer
Jacquin Strouss Lucena (born 1953), former First Lady of Colombia
Jerry Lucena (born 1980), retired Filipino footballer
Juan de Lucena (1430–1506), Spanish humanist
Luis Ramírez de Lucena (c. 1465 – c. 1530), Spanish chess player
Manuel Lucena (born 1982), retired Spanish footballer
Matt Lucena (born 1969), retired American tennis player
Nick Lucena (born 1979), American beach volleyball player
Rafael Lucena Marques (born 1989), Portuguese footballer
Ronaldo Lucena (born 1997), Venezuelan footballer
Tibisay Lucena, president of the National Electoral Council of Venezuela
Wendell Lucena Ramalho (born 1947), retired Brazilian football goalkeeper and coach
William Lucena (born 1981), retired Italian baseball pitcher

See also
Lucena (disambiguation)

References

Spanish-language surnames